Peters's flat-headed bat (Platymops setiger) is a species of bat in the family Molossidae and the monotypic genus Platymops. It is found in Ethiopia, Kenya, and South Sudan. Its natural habitats are dry savanna and rocky areas.

References

Further reading
Simmons, N. B. Order Chiroptera. In: Wilson, D. E.; Reeder, D. M. (Eds.). Mammal Species of the World: A Taxonomic and Geographic Reference. 3. ed. Baltimore: Johns Hopkins University Press, 2005. v. 1, p. 312-529.

Mammals described in 1878
Taxa named by Wilhelm Peters
Mammals of Ethiopia
Mammals of Kenya
Mammals of Sudan
Molossidae
Taxonomy articles created by Polbot